= North Main (Greenville, South Carolina) =

American neighborhood

Coordinates: 34.873°N 82.389°W

North Main is a walkable community next to Downtown Greenville, South Carolina.

The area was originally founded in 1813 to be the business sector of Greenville. Residential growth sprang up in the area until the Great Depression, and it was several decades before it began to grow again. With the rejuvenation of Downtown, North Main benefited and became a thriving hub.

As one of the oldest neighborhoods in Greenville, North Main is full of historic homes. With significant rejuvenation in recent decades, many of these homes have been renovated to keep their attraction while adding modern amenities. New single-family homes and other constructions are also present.

The North Main neighborhood is north of Stone Avenue; east of Mohawk Drive and Chick Springs Road; south of North Pleasantburg Drive; and west of Worley Road, Rutherford Street, and Rutherford Road.

Schools in the neighborhood include Stone Academy, Summit Drive Elementary School, and League Academy.
